This is a list of the main career statistics of former tennis player Monica Seles.

Significant finals

Grand Slam finals

Singles: 13 finals (9 titles, 4 runners-up)

Year-end championships finals

Singles: 4 finals (3 titles, 1 runner-up)

(i) = Indoor

Tier I finals

Singles: 18 finals (9 titles, 9 runners-up)

Doubles: 4 finals (3 titles, 1 runner-up)

Career finals

Singles: 85 (53 titles, 32 runner-ups)

Doubles: 9 (6 titles, 3 runners-up)

Team competition

Finals: 5 (3 titles, 2 runner-up)

Olympic singles bronze medal match

Fed Cup

Wins (3)

Participating (19)

Singles (17)

Doubles (2)

Singles performance timeline

WTA Tour career earnings

Head-to-head statistics

Head-to-head vs. top 10 ranked players

Top 10 wins

No. 1 wins

Longest winning streaks

36-match win streak (1990)

41-match Grand Slam win streak (1991–92)

References

External links
 
 
 

Tennis career statistics